The Biel/Bienne tramway network was part of the public transport network of the bilingual city of Biel/Bienne, in the canton of Bern, Switzerland, and its environs for more than 70 years.

Initially, the operator was the Compagnie générale des tramways suisses (TS) of Geneva, a predecessor of today's Transports Publics Genevois (TPC).  From 1901, the operator was Städtische Strassenbahn Biel / Tramway de Bienne (TrB), from which the present-day Verkehrsbetriebe Biel (VB) / Transports publics biennois (TPB) emerged.  In the 1940s, the tramways were gradually replaced by the Biel/Bienne trolleybus system and motor buses, until the network's closure in 1948. But the tramways were removed in 1954 only because it got tarred. When they were found in 1953 again, many people wanted to keep them but because of the new bus system this wasn't necessary.

, there was a proposal for the reintroduction of trams to Biel/Bienne.  The proposed new tramway would be named Regiotram, and would link Ipsach with Bözingen/Boujean (DE) from 2020, via the route of the Biel–Täuffelen–Ins-Bahn (DE).

History

Horsecar tramways 
On 18. August 1877, the Compagnie générale des tramways suisses (TS) opened a  horsecar tramway from Bözingen/Boujean to Nidau Schiffländte.  Biel/Bienne thereby became a very early venue for a tramway, before other Swiss cities such as Basel, Bern und Zürich.

The passenger tramcars, including both closed and open trams, were pulled by one or two horses. For mail carriage, a single-axle trailer was available.

The year after the tramway opened, on March 23, 1878, the line was extended  to Nidau Kirche. On several occasions, its operating company tried to sell the financially unsuccessful operation to the city of Biel/Bienne.  However, a sale took place, without any further line extensions, only in 1901.  From then onwards, the network's operator was Städtische Strassenbahn Biel / Tramway de Bienne (TrB).

Electric tramways 

After the 1901 takeover of the horsecar line by the city of Biel/Bienne, work began promptly on its electrification, and conversion to  metre gauge. Twelve electric motor tramcars were procured, and individual horse car trams were regauged for use as trailer cars. By 1902, electric operations had gradually been introduced.
 
In 1913 a second tramway was opened, to Mett/Mâche, and designated as line 3. There, it connected right from its opening day with the independent Biel–Meinisberg-Bahn (BMB).  At the same time, the existing tramway, which had previously operated without line designators, received the line numbers 1 and 2.

From 1916, the Biel–Täuffelen–Ins-Bahn connected in Nidau with the tramway network.

In 1930, lines 1 and 2 were combined into a new line 1, from Nidau to Bözingen/Boujean. As a result, the old line 3 became a new line 3, and line 4 mutated into a new line 3.
 
In the 1940s, two of the remaining tramways were converted to trolleybus operation. The first to be converted was line 2, in 1940.  On 8 December 1948, line 1 became a trolleybus route.  Meanwhile, line 3 was converted in 1940 to motor bus operation.

Lines 
At its maximum extent, i.e. between 1926 and 1938, during which period the BMB was also operated by the TrB, the network consisted of the following lines:

Proposed Regiotram 
, there was a proposal for the reintroduction of trams to Biel/Bienne.  The proposed new tramway, to be named Regiotram, would link Ipsach with Bözingen/Boujean, via the route of the Biel–Täuffelen–Ins-Bahn.  According to the proposal's timeline, a referendum would be held on the proposal in 2013, and if the proposal is approved, construction would begin in 2016, with the tramway scheduled to be commissioned in 2020.

See also

List of town tramway systems in Switzerland

References

Notes

Books

External links
Straßenbahn Biel/Bienne – tramcar fleet list 

This article is based upon a translation of the German language version as at November 2012.

Biel Bienne
Transport in Biel/Bienne
Biel/Bienne, Trams in
Biel/Bienne